Gemella palaticanis is a species of bacteria within the genus Gemella. Strains of this species were originally isolated from the mouth of a dog and are unique among Gemella species in that they can ferment lactose.

References

External links
Type strain of Gemella palaticanis at BacDive -  the Bacterial Diversity Metadatabase

Bacillales
Bacteria described in 1999